László Bánhidi (1906–1984) was a Hungarian actor.

Selected filmography
 
 Song of the Cornfields (1947)
 Treasured Earth (1948)
 Iron Flower (1958)
 The Smugglers (1958)
 Yesterday (1959)
 I'll Go to the Minister (1962)
 Fagyosszentek (1962)
 Tales of a Long Journey (1963)
 Háry János (1965)
 The Corporal and Others (1965)
 Stars of Eger (1968)
 The Upthrown Stone (1969)
 The Pagan Madonna (1981)
 Do not Panic, Major Kardos (1982)

External links

1906 births
1984 deaths
People from Satu Mare
Hungarian male film actors
Hungarian male television actors
20th-century Hungarian male actors